World Invitation Championships was the invitational event in badminton, which was conducted in the absence of a world championship (the first badminton world championship took place only in 1977) brought together top players from all major badminton nations in a kind of unofficial world championship.

About 
Thirteen World Invitation Tournaments took place in Scotland from 1954 to 1974 at Kelvin Hall in Glasgow. In November 1972, the Asia hosted first World Invitation Tournament in Jakarta. Others followed in Jakarta in October 1974 and in Kuala Lumpur in September 1975. In 1972 only the men's competitions were held and in 1974 and 1975 the women's competitions were reintroduced. 1974 had two editions, first of which was held in Glasgow in March where the second one was held in Jakarta in the month of October. One edition of Invitational World Championship was hosted by now defunct World Badminton Federation (WBF) in 1978.

Winners

Performances by nation

Sources 
 Pat Davis: The Encyclopaedia of Badminton. Robert Hale, London, 1987, S. 184, ISBN 0-7090-2796-6
 The Badminton Association of England: Annual Handbook, 1981-1982 Edition. Walker & Co, Twickenham, 1981, S. 131 

World Invitational Tournament